Theophilus Patrick Landey (1851-1935)  was an Anglican priest in Ireland in the late nineteenth and early 20th centuries.

Landy was educated at Trinity College, Dublin and ordained in 1896. After a curacy in Galway he held incumbencies at Tumna and Foxford. He was Archdeacon of Achonry from 1905 to 1915; and Dean of Killala from 1915 to 1928.

Notes

Alumni of Trinity College Dublin
19th-century Irish Anglican priests
20th-century Irish Anglican priests
Archdeacons of Achonry
Deans of Killala